Kaigal-ool Kim-oolovich Khovalyg (born 20 August 1960) is a Tuvan throat singer and co-founder of the Tuvan music group Huun-Huur-Tu.

A self-taught overtone singer, Khovalyg worked as a shepherd until the age of 18. His musical career began when he was invited to join the Tuvan State Ensemble in 1979. He settled in Kyzyl and started teaching throat singing and igil. In 1993, after more than ten years with the State Ensemble, he left to devote his attention to his newly formed group, Huun-Huur-Tu.

He has performed and recorded with the Tuva Ensemble, Vershki da Koreshki, the World Groove Band, and the Volkov Trio.

With a vocal range spanning tenor and bass, Khovalyg is particularly known for his skill in the khöömei and kargyraa singing styles.

Notes

References
 

1960 births
Living people
People from Dzun-Khemchiksky District
Tuvan musicians
Throat singing
20th-century Russian male singers
20th-century Russian singers
People from Kyzyl